Francis Robert Ellis,  (5 May 1849 – 25 November 1915) was the 22nd Auditor General and Accountant General and Controller of Revenue of Ceylon (now Sri Lanka).

He was born the son of Colonel F. Ellis.

He joined the Colonial Service in Ceylon as a writer in 1871 and became Judge of Ratnapura in 1883, Police Magistrate in Colombo in 1885 and Director and Inspector-General of Prisons, Ceylon in 1891. He progressed to Government Agent of the Southern Province in 1897 and of Western Province the same year. 

He was appointed Auditor General on 1 March 1902, succeeding William Thomas Taylor, and held the office until 1 March 1907, when he was succeeded by Bernard Senior. 

He then transferred to British North Borneo as Governor in 1911.

He married Lucy, daughter of D. B. Thornton of St. Petersburg.

References

|-

1849 births
1915 deaths
British colonial governors and administrators in Asia
Auditors General of Sri Lanka
Governors of North Borneo